REvolution is the fourth studio album by American rock band Lynch Mob, released in 2003. This album marks the return of vocalist Robert Mason and bassist Anthony Esposito to the band. The tracks of the album are re-worked versions of the band's first three albums, and Dokken songs of the George Lynch-era of the band.

Track listing

Personnel 
Robert Mason – vocals
George Lynch – guitars
Anthony Esposito – bass
Michael Frowein – drums

Additional personnel
Eunah Lee – graphic design
Jason Myers – art direction

References 

Lynch Mob (band) albums
2003 albums